Ku-ring-gai Council is a local government area in Northern Sydney (Upper North Shore), in the state of New South Wales, Australia. The area is named after the Guringai Aboriginal people who were thought to be the traditional owners of the area. More contemporary research suggests that this was not the case.

Major transport routes through the area include the Pacific Highway and North Shore railway line. Because of its good soils and elevated position as part of the Hornsby Plateau, Ku-ring-gai was originally covered by a large area of dry sclerophyll forest, parts of which still remain and form a component of the Ku-ring-gai Chase National Park. There are also many domestic gardens in the residential parts of Ku-ring-gai.

The Mayor of Ku-ring-gai Council is Cr. Jeff Pettett, an independent politician, elected on 11 January 2022.

Ku-ring-gai is the most advantaged area in Australia to live in, at the top of the Index of Relative Socio-economic Advantage and Disadvantage (IRSAD).

Suburbs and localities in the local government area 
Suburbs and localities serviced by Ku-ring-gai Council are:

Demographics 
Aboriginal and Torres Strait Islander people made up 0.2 per cent of the population, significantly below the national average of 3.2 per cent. The median age of people in the Ku-ring-gai Council area was 42 years; slightly above the national average of 38 years. Children aged 0 – 14 years made up 19.5 per cent of the population and people aged 65 years and over made up 19.3 per cent of the population. Of people in the area aged 15 years and over, 60.7 per cent were married and 7.2 per cent were either divorced or separated; a rate that is more than half the national average.

At the 2021 census, the population in the Ku-ring-gai Council area increased by 5.1 per cent. When compared with total population growth of Australia for the same period, being 8.6 per cent, population growth in the Ku-ring-gai local government area is slower than the national average. The median weekly income for residents within the Ku-ring-gai Council area was significantly higher than the national average.

At the 2021 census, the area was linguistically diverse, with Asian languages spoken in more than 20 per cent of households; more than four times the national average.

Council

Current composition and election method
Ku-ring-gai Council is composed of ten Councillors elected proportionally as five separate wards, each electing two Councillors. All Councillors are elected for a fixed four-year term of office, but due to delays as a result of amalgamation processes, the current term will only run for three years. The Mayor is elected bi-annually by the Councillors at the first meeting of the Council, while the Deputy Mayor is elected annually. The most recent full Council election was held on 4 December 2021, and the makeup of the Council is as follows:

The current Council, elected in 2021, in order of election by ward, is:

Council history
Ku-ring-gai was first incorporated on 6 March 1906 as the "Shire of Ku-ring-gai" and the first Shire Council was elected on 24 November 1906. The first leader of the council was elected at the first meeting on 8 December 1906, when Councillor William Cowan was elected as Shire President. There would not be a Deputy President until the council election on 1 March 1920.

On 22 September 1928, the Shire of Ku-ring-gai was proclaimed as the "Municipality of Ku-ring-gai" and the titles of 'Shire President' and 'Councillor' were retitled to be 'Mayor' and 'Alderman' respectively. In 1993, with the passing of a new Local Government Act, council was retitled as simply "Ku-ring-gai Council" and Aldermen were retitled as Councillors.

The Ku-ring-gai Council took the NSW Government to court and, on appeal, the NSW Court of Appeal found that the Council had been denied procedural fairness. The proposed merger was stood aside indefinitely. In July 2017, the Berejiklian government decided to abandon the forced merger of the Hornsby and Ku-ring-gai local government areas, along with several other proposed forced mergers.

Planning and development

During the term of former Planning Minister, Frank Sartor, planning law reforms were passed that gave development approval to a panel and away from local government. These new laws were controversially implemented in Ku-ring-gai, with immense opposition from the local population who claim that their suburbs, with nationally recognised heritage values in both housing and original native forest, are being trashed by slab-sided apartment developments with no effective protection provided by either the Ku-ring-gai Council or the State Government. This has been termed "The Rape of Ku-ring-gai".

The laws are intended to take development approval power away from local councils and to the Planning NSW, via the development panels. Planning panels are about to be introduced across New South Wales under recently passed planning reforms. In 2005-06, Ku-ring-gai had the second highest reported total development value in the state - A$1.7 billion, more than Parramatta, second only to the City of Sydney.

Shire Clerks, Town Clerks and General Managers

Heritage listings 
Ku-ring-gai Council has a number of heritage-listed sites, including:
 Gordon, 17 McIntosh Street: Eryldene, Gordon
 Gordon, Middlemiss Street: Gordon railway station, Sydney
 Gordon, 691 Pacific Highway: Iolanthe, Gordon
 Gordon, 707 Pacific Highway: Tulkiyan
 Gordon, 799 Pacific Highway: Gordon Public School (former)
 Killara, 13 Kalang Avenue: Harry and Penelope Seidler House
 Killara, 1 Werona Avenue: Woodlands, Killara
 Lindfield, 33 Tryon Road: Tryon Road Uniting Church
 Pymble, Pacific Highway: Pymble Reservoirs No. 1 and No. 2
 Pymble, 982-984 Pacific Highway: Pymble Substation
 Pymble, 29 Telegraph Road: Eric Pratten House
 Turramurra, 17 Boomerang Street: Ingleholme
 Turramurra, 43 Ku-Ring-Gai Avenue: Cossington (Turramurra)
 Wahroonga, 62 Boundary Road: Jack House, Wahroonga
 Wahroonga, 69-71 Clissold Road: Rose Seidler House
 Wahroonga, 61-65 Coonanbarra Road: St John's Uniting Church, Wahroonga
 Wahroonga, 16 Fox Valley Road: Purulia, Wahroonga
 Wahroonga, 69 Junction Road: Evatt House
 Wahroonga, North Shore railway: Wahroonga railway station
 Wahroonga, 1526 Pacific Highway: Mahratta, Wahroonga
 Wahroonga, 1678 Pacific Highway and Woonona Avenue: Wahroonga Reservoir
 Wahroonga, 23 Roland Avenue: Simpson-Lee House I
 Wahroonga, 14 Woonona Avenue: The Briars, Wahroonga

See also

 Local government areas of New South Wales
 WildThings, a 2004 urban fauna translocation program

References

External links
Ku-Ring-Gai Council
Ku-Ring-Gai Art Centre and Gallery Artabase page

 
Local government areas in Sydney
1906 establishments in Australia